Great strike or great strikes may refer to:

Asia
 The Great Bombay textile strike, a 1982 strike of textile workers

Australia and Pacific Islands
 The 1913 Great Strike, a general strike in New Zealand
 The Australian general strike, 1917, also simply the Great Strike

Europe
 The London dock strike of 1889, also the Great Dock Strike, involving dock workers in the Port of London

North America
 The Great Railroad Strike of 1877, or the Great Upheaval
 The Great Railroad Strike of 1922, or the Railway Shopmen's Strike
 The Great Southwest railroad strike of 1886, an 1886 strike against the Union Pacific and Missouri Pacific railroads
 The Flint sit-down strike, also the great GM sit down strike, a 1936–1937 strike against General Motors
 The Strike wave of 1945–46, also the great strike wave of 1946, the largest strikes in American labor history

See also
 List of strikes